The 2013–14 NCAA Division I men's ice hockey season began in October 2013 and ended with the 2014 NCAA Division I Men's Ice Hockey Tournament's championship game in April 2014. This was the 67th season in which an NCAA ice hockey championship was held, and the 120th year overall in which an NCAA school fielded a team.

Conference realignment

The March 2011 announcement that the Big Ten Conference would start sponsoring men's ice hockey in the 2013–14 season, which came shortly after Penn State had announced that it would upgrade its team from club to full varsity status effective in 2012–13, led to a major wave of conference realignment in that sport. Once the Big Ten took the ice with six teams, the Central Collegiate Hockey Association (CCHA) faced the loss of three of its mainstays (Michigan, Michigan State, Ohio State), while the Western Collegiate Hockey Association (WCHA) was set to lose two prominent members (Minnesota and Wisconsin).

Several CCHA and WCHA members then entered into talks to break away from their current leagues to form a new conference; six of these schools would soon form the National Collegiate Hockey Conference (NCHC), which would also take the ice in 2013–14. Further moves by both the NCHC and WCHA would eventually lead to the demise of the CCHA after the 2012–13 season. The upheaval also gave Hockey East its first non-New England member in Notre Dame.

In the end, the only conferences that neither gained nor lost members for 2013–14 were Atlantic Hockey and ECAC Hockey. The former conference would go on to lose UConn to Hockey East, which was already home to the school's women's team, for the 2014–15 season.

Membership changes

Polls

Pre-season
The top 20 from USCHO.com, September 30, 2013, and the top 15 from USA Today/USA Hockey Magazine, September 23, 2013. First place votes are in parentheses.

Regular season

Standings

2014 NCAA Tournament

Note: * denotes overtime period(s)

Player stats

Scoring leaders

GP = Games played; G = Goals; A = Assists; Pts = Points; PIM = Penalty minutes

Leading goaltenders

GP = Games played; Min = Minutes played; W = Wins; L = Losses; T = Ties; GA = Goals against; SO = Shutouts; SV% = Save percentage; GAA = Goals against average

Awards

NCAA

Atlantic Hockey

Big Ten

ECAC

Hockey East

NCHC

WCHA

Hober Baker Award

See also
 2013–14 NCAA Division II men's ice hockey season
 2013–14 NCAA Division III men's ice hockey season

References

 
NCAA